Villain is a 2002 Indian Tamil-language heist action film written and directed by K. S. Ravikumar and produced by S. S. Chakravarthy. The film stars Ajith Kumar in a dual role alongside Meena and Kiran Rathod. Vidyasagar composed the score and soundtrack for the film. It was remade in Telugu as the same name in 2003. The film released on 4 November 2002. It received positive reviews and became a huge commercial success.

Plot
Shiva and Vishnu are identical twins. Shiva, the elder one, is a bus conductor, while Vishnu, the younger one, has a mild intellectual disability. During their childhood, Shiva overhears his parents' plot to send Vishnu to an unknown orphanage and to hide this information from him. To save his brother Vishnu, Shiva runs away to another city with him and strives hard to look after him. A 'dada' Sundaramoorthy, who runs a beggar trade, beats Vishnu brutally, and Vishnu becomes disabled for life. Shiva leaves Vishnu in a home run by a social worker Lalitha. During the day, Shiva works as a bus conductor, and at the same time, poses as Vishnu: to play Robin Hood and steal from the rich and corrupt. A gang including Thangam, Mani, and others assist him in these operations. He is never suspected, and so, with the stolen money, he takes care of not only Vishnu, but also 800 people in other institutions for the physically disabled. A college student Lavanya falls in love with Shiva, but he later learns that she is Sundaramoorthy's sister-in-law. Matters worsen when Sundaramoorthy becomes the chairman of the institute for the physically disabled. How Shiva deals with the situation forms the rest of the story. Meanwhile, Thangam is secretly in love with Shiva, though he does not know this. Later she gives up her love and lets Lavanya marry Shiva. At last, Shiva marries Lavanya and Thangam marries Vishnu. The brothers live happily ever after.

Cast

 Ajith Kumar as Shiva and Vishnu (dual role)
 Meena as Thangam
 Kiran Rathod  as Lavanya
 Sujatha as Lalitha Subramaniam 
 FEFSI Vijayan as Sundaramoorthy
 Ramesh Khanna as Mani, Shiva's friend
 Karunas as Nochikuppam Dampudi
 Vijayakumar as ACP
 Nizhalgal Ravi as Shiva and Vishnu's father
 Dinesh Sha as Childhood Shiva
 Naresh Sha as Childhood Vishnu
 Pyramid Natarajan as Minister
 Manobala as Pyramid Natarajan's brother-in-law
 Rekha as Rajalakshmi, Lavanya's sister
 Santhana Bharathi as Father Karunakaran
 Crane Manohar as Shiva's friend
 Vasu Vikram as Shiva's friend
 Pandu as a police officer
 Bayilvan Ranganathan as a police officer
 Madhan Bob as Sundaramoorthy's assistant
 Lavanya as Thangam's friend
 Vinu Chakravarthy as Minister
 Priyanka as Lavanya's friend
 R. S. Shivaji as Pyramid Natarajan's House Security
 R. Sundarrajan as Minister's related 
 Besant Ravi
 Kanal Kannan in a special appearance as a henchman
 K. S. Ravikumar in a special appearance as himself
 Vasanthi (Agent Tina) in a special appearance in "Adicha Nethi Adi"

Production
The film saw the first collaboration of Ajith and K. S. Ravikumar, with the former revealing that he was initially reluctant to work with the director in fear of a misunderstanding. Kiran was signed the film after the success of Gemini. The shooting of the film was completed in 39 days.

Soundtrack
The soundtrack features 7 songs composed by Vidyasagar and lyrics written by Vairamuthu.

Release and reception
The film was released in Diwali on 4 November 2002 alongside Vijay starrer Bagavathi. The Hindu reviewer claimed that "if you don't rack your brains about the feasibility of the hero's game plans, you could enjoy watching "Villain"" and that "Ajit scores on both fronts". Another critic cited that it was "great slag-less and racy screenplay and some stunning performances from Ajith make this film a treat for the senses". Ajith's performance earned him his second Filmfare Award for Best Actor. The film was later remade in Telugu with the same title by Ravikumar with Rajasekhar, while the original was also dubbed into Hindi.

References

External links

2002 films
Tamil films remade in other languages
Films set in Chennai
Twins in Indian films
Films directed by K. S. Ravikumar
2000s Tamil-language films
Films scored by Vidyasagar
Robin Hood films
Indian action films
2002 action films